Juan Romero (born 19 October 1988 in Montevideo, Uruguay) is an Uruguayan judoka. 

He competed at the 2012 Summer Olympics in the -90 kg event, where he lost in first round against South Korean Song Dae-nam who won the gold medal.

He also competed at the 2015 Pan American Games in the -90 kg event finishing 7th.

References 

1988 births
Living people
Uruguayan male judoka
Olympic judoka of Uruguay
Judoka at the 2012 Summer Olympics
Pan American Games competitors for Uruguay
Judoka at the 2015 Pan American Games
Sportspeople from Montevideo
South American Games silver medalists for Uruguay
South American Games medalists in judo
Competitors at the 2014 South American Games
21st-century Uruguayan people